Fernando Vellosillo Barrio (died 18 February 1587) was a Roman Catholic prelate who served as Bishop of Lugo (1567–1587).

Biography
On 13 January 1567, Fernando Vellosillo Barrio was appointed during the papacy of Pope Pius V as Bishop of Lugo. He served as Bishop of Lugo until his death on 18 February 1587. While bishop, he was the principal co-consecrator of Juan de Sanclemente Torquemada, Bishop of Orense (1579).

References

External links and additional sources
 (for Chronology of Bishops) 
 (for Chronology of Bishops) 

1587 deaths
16th-century Roman Catholic bishops in Spain
Bishops appointed by Pope Pius V